Dar Si Said is a historic late 19th-century palace and present-day museum in Marrakesh, Morocco.

History 
It was built between 1894 and 1900 by Si Sa'id ibn Musa, a vizier and minister of defence under his brother Ba Ahmad ibn Musa, who was the Grand Vizier and effective ruler of Morocco during the same period under Sultan Abdelaziz (ruled 1894–1908). After 1914, under the French Protectorate administration, the palace served as the seat of the regional leaders of Marrakesh. It was converted into a museum of "indigenous arts" (meaning Moroccan art) and woodcraft in 1930 or 1932. In 1957, after Moroccan independence, the palace was split into a museum section and a section occupied by the Service de l’Artisanat (Agency of Artisanship). It has been restored several times since and remains a museum today. Following the most recent renovations, carried out by the recently-created Fondation Nationale des Musées, the museum reopened in 2018 as the National Museum of Weaving and Carpets.

Architecture 
The palace's architecture is similar in ornament to the Bahia Palace built further south by his father and his brother, but unlike the latter it is built over more than one level and has a very different layout. Its architectural highlights include a grand reception hall on the upper floor and a large riad garden with a central pavilion of painted wood.

Museum collection 
The museum collections includes a wide variety of objects, many of them from the southern regions of Morocco. Until recently the museum's exhibits focused on Moroccan wooden art and objects. Following its reopening in 2018, its current exhibits now focus on weaving and Moroccan carpets.

Andalusian marble basin 
Among the most significant objects of the general collection is an elaborately carved marble basin from the Caliphate era of Cordoba. It was crafted at Madinat al-Zahra between 1002 and 1007 to serve as ablutions basin and was dedicated to 'Abd al-Malik, the son of al-Mansur, and was one of a series. It was previously kept at the Ben Youssef Madrasa for centuries and was first noted by experts in 1923. Scholar Mariam Rosser-Owen has suggested that the basin was originally imported to Marrakesh by Ali Ibn Yusuf, who incorporated a number of marble spolia from the ruined palaces of Cordoba in the Ben Youssef Mosque that he built in the 12th century. The basin would have then been re-used again for the Ben Youssef Madrasa, which was built in the same area much later, after the mosque had fallen into neglect.

Gallery

See also 

 Marrakech Museum
 Bahia Palace
 Nejjarine Museum (in Fes)

References 

Palaces in Marrakesh
Museums in Morocco